Sangoma Technologies Corporation (Sangoma) provides Communications as a Service (“CaaS”) products globally for businesses. It was founded in 1984. It is publicly traded on the Toronto Stock Exchange.

Acquisitions  
Sangoma acquired FreePBX publisher Schmooze on January 2, 2015. FreePBX, an open source GUI (graphical user interface) that controls and manages Asterisk, is bundled into various Asterisk-based third-party products such as trixbox, PBX in a Flash and Incredible PBX. Sangoma acquired Digium, Inc., a communications technology company based in Huntsville, Alabama, on September 5, 2018.

References

External links 
 

Computer companies of Canada
Networking hardware companies
FreePBX
Companies based in Markham, Ontario
Computer companies established in 1984
Telecommunications companies established in 1984
1984 establishments in Ontario
Companies listed on the Toronto Stock Exchange
Companies formerly listed on the TSX Venture Exchange